Tim Donnelly is an American baseball coach who is the interim head baseball coach of the Akron Zips. He played college baseball at Northeast Texas Community College before transferring to Hardin–Simmons.

Coaching career
On January 4, 2023, Donnelly was promoted from assistant coach to the interim head coach of the Akron Zips.

Head coaching record

References

External links
Akron Zips bio

Living people
Akron Zips baseball coaches
Hardin–Simmons Cowboys baseball players
Kent State Golden Flashes baseball coaches
Malone Pioneers baseball coaches
Marshall Thundering Herd baseball coaches
Middle Tennessee Blue Raiders baseball coaches
Northeast Texas Eagles baseball players
Southeastern Louisiana Lions baseball coaches
Western Kentucky Hilltoppers baseball coaches
1980 births